Benton Harbor Fruit Market began in 1860 as an outlet for Southwest Michigan farm products.  By 2020, it operated four types of businesses including high volume wholesale produce, small wholesalers, retail, storage, and a market restaurant. Benton Harbor, Michigan is located in Michigan's fruit belt and is situated part way between Chicago and Detroit.  The market operates seasonally.

History

At inception, the market operated from the city wharves on Lake Michigan. When the primary mode of transport shifted from ships to trains and trucks, the market moved to the north side of Benton Harbor.  In the 1940s the market had grown to the point that it was called "the largest cash-to-growers outlet in the world".  The market supplied produce to restaurants, grocery stores, and retail customers.  In 1960 the market accommodated 293 buyer stalls on a 16-acre facility which included wholesale and retail markets, a restaurant, and a migrant labor camp. The principle products sold at that time were strawberries, peaches and tomatoes, representing half of the entire United States sales of these crops.
The market was owned and operated by the City of Benton Harbor, but today it is owned and operated by Benton Harbor Fruit Market Inc.

On July 20, 1970, the market was the destination for a protest march organized by Michigan labor activists in support of the California Grape Boycott organized by Cesar Chavez, Dolores Huerta, and the United Farm Workers.

In 2010, the nearby Southwest Michigan Regional Airport sued the Market for eminent domain to gain five acres of the fruit market's land.  In 2011 A Berrien County Circuit Court lawsuit resulted in a $2.25 million compensation to the Market.

References

External links
 Dunbar, Willis Frederick. Western Michigan at Work. Radio program, WKZO, 5 minutes, 11 seconds, aired September 27, 1947.

1860 establishments in Michigan
Food markets in the United States
Michigan State Historic Sites
Benton Harbor, Michigan